The exhibition Battle of the Sexes – Franz von Stuck to Frida Kahlo 
(Geschlechterkampf – Franz von Stuck bis Frida Kahlo) was held from
24 November 2016 to 19 March 2017 at the Städel-Museum in Frankfurt
am Main. 140 paintings, films and sculptures reflected the change in gender
roles and the perception of these roles.

As logo of the exhibition two paintings have been used: Salome by Jean Benner
and Elle (She) by Gustav-Adolf Mossa, the depiction of a
femme fatale with the blood of her male victims smeared on her thighs,
sitting on a mountain of their corpses. Her genitalia are hidden by a cat. An 
inscription reads: hoc volo, sic iubeo; sit pro ratione voluntas.

Tuning in 

The walls of the reception area are inscribed with relevant hashtags and
quotes from newspaper articles. These tags and quotes are not commented and not
mentioned again in the exhibition or the catalogue.

Hashtags 

 #Aufschrei (outcry)
 #Ausnahmslos (without exception)
 #BattleOfTheSexes
 #DieQuoteGilt (the quota is imperative)
 #GenderMainstreaming
 #GenderPayGap
 #Genderpricing
 #Geschlechterkampf
 #Gleichberechtigung (equality)
 #HeForShe
 #IchKaufDasNicht (I will not buy that)
 #ImZugPassiert (happened in a train)
 #IStandUp
 #KampfDerGeschlechter
 #ManSplaining
 #Manterrupting
 #NeinHeißtNein (no means no)
 #NoBra
 #NotOkay
 #PinkStinks
 #PinkTax
 #RapeCulture
 #RegrettingMotherhood
 #Sexismus
 #SheDidItWithBrains
 #WomenNotObjects
 #VictimBlaming

Clippings 
The quotes are taken from these articles:

 English-language media
 11 May 2016, Newsweek: Google's new female emojis aim to promote equality 
 24 May 2016, The Guardian: How to get ahead in Silicon Valley: hide being a woman says male "expert"
 6 June 2016: Is fat shaming male celebrities a sign of gender equality?
 11 October 2016, Irish Independent: Clinton versus Trump is a battle of two Americas - and of two sexes 
 2 November 2016, Artnet News: Facebook censors Caravaggio's nude Cupid, then changes mind 
 Augsburger Allgemeine
 17 May 2016: High Heels Pflicht: Petition gegen hohe Absätze 
 Bild
 22 September 2016: Männer sind anders - Frauen auch "Wir gleichberechtigen uns zu Tode" 
 Cicero
 10 December 2013: Der moderne Mann: Weichei in Frauenhand 
 Deutschlandradio Kultur
 20 March 2015: Gleichheit im Pop-Geschäft. Feministinnen, die mit dem Po wackeln
 16 September 2015: Frauenrollen. Feminismus bleibt notwendig
 13 September 2016: Gender-Bashing ist der neue Volkssport
 Focus
 1 October 2013: Ewiger Geschlechterkampf Warum sich Männer mit dem Putzeimer so schwer tun 
 Frankfurter Allgemeine Zeitung
 6 February 2015: Wortschöpfung "Mansplaining": Komm, Kleines, ich erklär' dir die Welt 
 1 March 2016: Maskulinität in der Krise: Wo sind die echten Männer? 
 10 March 2016: Mütter im Unglück: Stillst Du noch? Bereust Du schon?
 2 October 2016: Sexismus und die CDU. Süße Mäuse sind gefährlich 
 3 October 2016: Papst verurteilt Gendertheorie: "Krieg zur Zerstörung der Ehe"
 Hannoversche Allgemeine
 10 November 2014: Zeichen der Gleichberechtigung: Das Ampelmädchen kommt 
 Spiegel Online
 23 April 2012: Der Mann, das Tier 
 3 December 2013: Hirnforschung: Männer und Frauen sind unterschiedlich verdrahtet
 14 August 2014: Sexismus-Posse im Schwarzwald: Park & Weib
 12 November 2015: #IchKaufDasNicht: Halbnackte Frauen auf Milchshakes 
 29 April 2016: Sexismus in Schulbüchern: Normal ist, wenn Papa arbeitet und Mama kocht
 20 September 2016: Neue Männerzeitschriften: Null Vulven gefunden
 26 October 2016: Bis zur Gleichberechtigung noch 100 Jahre
 5 November 2016: Frauen, macht Schluss mit dem Frauenhass!
 Stern
 30 October 2015: Weiblich! Ledig! Na und! Männer! Warum habt ihr Angst vor starken Frauen?
 20 May 2016: Neue Studie zum Gender Gap 
 1 July 2016: Bewerbungsfoto mit tiefem Ausschnitt erhöht Chancen auf Vorstellungsgespräch 
 15 August 2016: Ohne BH ist Trend: Freiheit für die Brüste!
 Süddeutsche Zeitung
 27 June 2006: Maskulisten: Pöbeln für die Männlichkeit 
 4 June 2013: Uni Leipzig: Aus Herr Professor wird Herr Professorin
 30 September 2016: Rape Culture "Wir entmündigen vergewaltigte Frauen
 27 February: Hat der Feminismus die Liebe kaputtgemacht? 
 Tagesspiegel
 11 May 2016: Staatliches Verbot von sexistischer Werbung: Sexismus ist keine Geschmacksfrage 
 Die Tageszeitung
 26 March 2014: Sexstreik in der Ukraine: Bei Zeus, warum nie Männer?
 14 October 2016: Yes we can change
 Die Welt
 30 September 2013: Den Männern reicht es mit der Gleichberechtigung
 12 December 2015: Ich wollt, ich wär ein Mann
 26 January 2016: Frauen in Führungspositionen so hart wie Männer. Was die Macht mit Frauen macht
 Für Frauen reicht es nicht mehr, nur schön zu sein
 Wochenblatt - Die Zeitung für alle online 
 9 April 2016: SPD-Minister erwägt Verbot: Wie sexy darf Werbung sein? 
 Die Zeit
 2 October 2014: Vereinbarkeit: Wieso Familie und Beruf nicht zu vereinbaren sind 
 28 May 2015: Kreativität: Wen die Muse küsst 
 18 January 2016: Sind wir über Nacht zu einer feministischen Nation geworden?
 26 May 2016: James Bond: Jane, nicht James
 9 June 2016: Gleichheit der Geschlechter: Die große Illusion
 9 October 2016: #notokay: Aufschrei gegen Trump
 Zeit Online
 14 June 2016: Gleichberechtigung: Der Einkommensunterschied ist noch viel größer
 Neue Zürcher Zeitung
 3 November 2016: Wenn das Begehren vor dem Richter steht 
 Ghostbusters Neuverfilmung: Neuer "Ghostbusters"-Film mit Frauen in den Hauptrollen löst Shitstorm aus
 Den Männern reicht es mit der Gleichberechtigung
 Maus & Kaninchen

#LetsTalkAboutSexes 
Parallel to the exhibition the social media campaign #LetsTalkAboutSexes took place.
A selection of the created articles are collected in the Städel blog as
"Kunst der Moderne #LetsTalkAboutSexes – die Beiträge zur Social-Media-Aktion"
(see external links).

Exhibited works 

On display were drawings, photographs, films, sculptures and paintings.

Films 

Films shown in the exhibition were mostly from the Pre-Code-era.

Sculptures 
There were other versions or castings of these sculptures present:

Marcello's sculpture Pythia is a representation of the priest of the oracle of Delphi,
who made her prophecies under the influence of hallucinogenic gas. They were then interpreted by
male priests. Well known is the prediction to the people of Athens to use wooden walls as a means to
defeat the Persians. This was taken as advice to build triremes. The Persian fleet was defeated in the
Battle of Salamis. On display is one of many castings of this main work of Marcello.
The male pseudonym was used by the countess Adélaïde Nathalie Marie Hedwige Philippine d’Affry, 
who could not benefit from an education at the PAFA where Eakins
allowed women to study the nude. Therefore, she used castings of her own body in creating
the sculpture.

The tennis player was able to engage in this sport as rules on female clothing had
by the time been relaxed.

Paintings 

Suzanne Valadon modeled herself as Eve. Adam is a portrait of her muse, her twenty
years younger lover. Both grab together for the forbidden fruit. Lilith was Adam's 
first wife and had to be replaced by Eve, when she showed her open hair in 
public and also fell otherwise out of the female role model.

Clytemnestra is holding the sword she used to kill her husband, after he was 
willing to sacrifice their daughter Iphigenia to Artemis.

Franz von Stuck, Edvard Munch, Otto Dix and Frida Kahlo are
all represented by a number of paintings.

Meret Oppenheim's My Nurse is part of the exhibition.

Stereo Night 

The Stereo Night was an Städelnächte event. A music program, parts of 
the permanent Städel exhibition and the complete Geschlechterkampf could
be visited. During the night there were Art Battles: The speakers of
the audio guides Constanze Becker and Felix Rech played a married
couple from the last century, that discussed the change of gender roles.
They mentioned Dr. Haustein (whose portrait with curettage by Christian Schad
is part of the exhibition), who helped them to have only seven children and not 
fourteen. Also a new treatment for hysteria - the Jolly Molly - was talked about.

Perception 

Art used the exhibition as a cover story with the headlines "Leider geil!", 
"Lustmord-Bilder sind der Höhepunkt des Frauenhasses" and "Der groteske US-Wahlkampf 
war der totale Geschlechterkampf". 
Kunstzeitung speaks of a parade full of facets, spanning a hundred 
years.
Handelsblatt sees a contrast between first rate works and sultry perfumed paintings from the
second tier.
Schwäbische Zeitung describes the fighting scenes as a traditional costume parade at a town 
festival.
Frankfurter Allgemeine Zeitung comments on the timing of the exhibition at
the inauguration of Donald Trump.

Literature 
 Battle of the sexes: Franz von Stuck to Frida Kahlo, Felix Krämer, Cynthia Hall, Städel Museum, Prestel-Verlag, München, London, New York, 2016
 Geschlechterkampf: Franz von Stuck bis Frida Kahlo, Felix Krämer, Städel, Prestel, München, Frankfurt, 2016 
 Geschlechterkampf, Brochure of the Städel-Museum, available at the Museumshop

References

External links 
 Website
 Digitorial
 
 #LetsTalkAboutSexes – die Beiträge zur Social-Media-Aktion 10 February 2017, Sarah Omar

2016 in art
Museums in Frankfurt
Art exhibitions in Germany
Articles containing video clips
Feminist art